The 2005 New York Mets season was the 44th regular season for the Mets. They went 83-79 and finished 3rd in the NL East. They were managed by Willie Randolph. They played home games at Shea Stadium. The 2005 season is also noteworthy for being Mike Piazza's last season as a Met. In the last game of the season, he was given a long standing ovation from the fans at Shea Stadium.

Offseason
November 30, 2004: Kris Benson was signed as a free agent with the New York Mets.

Regular season

Season standings

National League East

Record vs. opponents

Roster

Player stats

Batting

Starters by position
Note: Pos = Position; G = Games played; AB = At bats; H = Hits; Avg. = Batting average; HR = Home runs; RBI = Runs batted in

Other batters
Note: G = Games played; AB = At bats; H = Hits; Avg. = Batting average; HR = Home runs; RBI = Runs batted in

Pitching

Starting pitchers 
Note: G = Games pitched; IP = Innings pitched; W = Wins; L = Losses; ERA = Earned run average; SO = Strikeouts

Other pitchers
Note: G = Games pitched; IP = Innings pitched; W = Wins; L = Losses; ERA = Earned run average; SO = Strikeouts

Relief pitchers
Note: G = Games pitched; W = Wins; L = Losses; SV = Saves; ERA = Earned run average; SO = Strikeouts

Game log 

|-

|-

|-

|-

|-

|-

|- bgcolor="#fcc"
|-

Farm system

References

External links
2005 New York Mets at Baseball Reference
2005 New York Mets team page at www.baseball-almanac.com

New York Mets seasons
New York Mets
New York Mets
2000s in Queens